Undone is a British science fiction comedy radio series based on the theme of parallel universes, written by and starring Ben Moor for BBC Radio 7. The series follows the life of Edna Turner (Sarah Solemani in the pilot and series 1; and Alex Tregear from series 2 onwards), who moves to London to work on a listings magazine in London called Get Out!. In London, she encounters a man called Tankerton Slopes (Moor), who comes from an alternative version of London called "Undone" - the place "where the weirdness comes from." Everything weird or strange in London has flowed from Undone, while mundane things flow from London to Undone. Tankerton offers Edna a job of patrolling the gaps between the two cities, and trying to find Undoners hiding in London and send them, because if they stay too long London becomes too strange and reality may be destroyed.

Undone was first broadcast as a pilot on 26 March 2006, entitled "Mind the Gaps" The first full series, lasting four episodes, was broadcast between 3 and 6 October 2006. Following the pilot, all the episodes in this and the other series begin with the prefix "un". Series 2, which was six episodes long, was broadcast between 20 January and 24 February 2008. Series 3, which was also six episodes, was transmitted between 28 November 2009 and 2 January 2010. All three series were produced by Colin Anderson, with the third series also being co-produced with Lyndsay Fenner.

Series

Pilot: 2006
{| class="wikitable plainrowheaders" style="width:98%;"
|-
! style="background-color: #7F80FF;"| # 
! style="background-color: #7F80FF"| Title
! style="background-color: #7F80FF"| Produced by
! style="background-color: #7F80FF;"| Original airdate 

|}

Series 1: 2006
{| class="wikitable plainrowheaders" style="width:98%;"
|-
! style="background-color: #FF5F5F;"| # 
! style="background-color: #FF5F5F"| Title
! style="background-color: #FF5F5F"| Produced by
! style="background-color: #FF5F5F;"| Original airdate 

|}

Series 2: 2008
{| class="wikitable plainrowheaders" style="width:98%;"
|-
! style="background-color: #FF7FFF;"| # 
! style="background-color: #FF7FFF"| Title
! style="background-color: #FF7FFF"| Produced by
! style="background-color: #FF7FFF;"| Original airdate 

|}

Series 3: 2009-2010
{| class="wikitable plainrowheaders" style="width:98%;"
|-
! style="background-color: #80FF7F;"| # 
! style="background-color: #80FF7F"| Title
! style="background-color: #80FF7F"| Produced by
! style="background-color: #80FF7F;"| Original airdate 

|}

References
General
 
 

Specific

External links
BBC Homepage for Undone

Lists of British radio series episodes